Pic de Gerlache is a mountain in  King Frederick VIII Land, NE Greenland. Administratively it is part of the Northeast Greenland National Park.

History
This nunatak was named in 1905 by the Duke of Orléans during his Arctic Expedition on ship Belgica, when he explored parts of the northeastern coast of Greenland. He named it after Belgian explorer Adrien de Gerlache (1866–1934).

Although this peak was an important landmark for the first explorers of the area, the 1906–08 Danmark Expedition was unable to identify the original peak. Since the expedition members considered that the name should be preserved, it was placed on a conspicuous  mountain rising on the north side of Gammel Hellerup Glacier.

A few years later, Ejnar Mikkelsen described this mountain as a pyramid during the 1909-12 Alabama Expedition:

Geography
Pic de Gerlache is located in Norre Biland, the northern section of Duke of Orleans Land. It rises from a nunatak a few kilometers inland in the central zone of Jokel Bay. On some maps the name is misplaced westwards to a slightly higher but less prominent nunatak peak.

See also
List of mountains in Greenland
List of Nunataks§Greenland

Bibliography
Greenland geology and selected mineral occurrences - GEUS

References

Gerlache
Nunataks of Greenland